Crystal Velasquez is an author. She has written four books based on the PBS show Maya and Miguel, plus the books in the Your Life But... series. Velazquez currently lives in Flushing, Queens in New York City. She is also a production editor and a freelance proofreader.

Education
Velasquez has a bachelor's degree in creative writing from Pennsylvania State University and is a graduate from the New York University Summer Publishing Institute.

Maya and Miguel series
Velasquez has written a series of four books based on the show in the Maya and Miguel on PBS television 
Maya & Miguel: My Twin Brother / My Twin Sister (flip Chapter Book), 
Neighborhood Friends (Maya & Miguel), 
Maya & Miguel: The Valentine Machine, 
Paint the Town,

Your Life But ... series
The Your Life But... series is targeted to Teens and Tweens. It is a Choose Your Own Adventure series with a twist: instead of just picking an option of what to do at the end of the chapter, you take a personality quiz. Your results direct you to another page of the book, where the story continues. There are currently three books in the series: Your Life But Better, Your Life But Cooler, and Your Life But Sweeter.

Hunters of Chaos series
Four girls at a southwestern boarding school discover they have amazing feline powers and must unite to stop an ancient evil. 
Hunters of Chaos, 
The Circle of Lies,

References

External links

 Official Website

American children's writers
Pennsylvania State University alumni
Living people
Year of birth missing (living people)
American women children's writers
21st-century American women